The TR-125 (TR-125 stands for "Tanc Românesc 125" - Romanian Tank 125) prototype main battle tank is a redesigned T-72 made in Romania with Romanian components only. Number 125 in the designation stands for the 125 mm A555 smoothbore tank gun. It is now designated P-125 (P stands for Prototype).

History
In the late 1970s - early 1980s, Romania ordered 30 T-72M main battle tanks from the USSR. The Romanian government asked USSR for a license to build T-72 tanks locally. Rebuffed by the Soviet leaders, the communist government decided to reverse-engineer the T-72 tank.

The tank was developed from 1984 to 1991. The turret and the loading mechanism were developed by ICSITEM research institute from Bucharest, while the chassis was designed by ACSIT–P 124 from the F.M.G.S. (FMGS stands for "Fabrica de Mașini Grele Speciale" - Special Heavy Equipment Factory) division of the "23rd August" (now known as FAUR) factory from Bucharest.

Between five and ten prototypes were made between 1987 and 1988 and tested until 1991. An order from the Romanian Army did not come however, and the project was later canceled. The prototypes are kept in storage.

Description
The vehicle has a modified suspension with seven pairs of wheels, unlike the T-72 and most tanks based on it which have six. This allowed the hull to be stretched by 1 m and installation of a more powerful 850-900 HP diesel engine 8VSA3, basically a variant of the engine mounted in TR-85. It used an old DShK machine gun for anti-aircraft purposes and was fitted with extra armour. The 125mm A555 smoothbore tank gun was developed by Arsenal Reșița factory. As a result of these changes the tank's weight increased from 41.5 tonnes (T-72M) to around 50 tonnes.

Operators
  - The exact number varies according to the source: 3, 5 or 10 prototypes.

References and notes
References

References

External links
 Brief history of tanks in Romanian Army
 One of the very few active topics discussing TR-125 on the Romanian internet
 Polish page about T-72 based tanks including TR-125
 Global security page about TR-125

Main battle tanks of Romania
Main battle tanks of the Cold War
Romania–Soviet Union relations
T-72